The Geelong Raiders Rugby League Football Club are an Australian rugby league football club based in Newtown, Victoria. They compete in the Victorian Rugby League competition.

The club started life as the Geelong Tiger Snakes, but in 2010 the club folded due to flagging numbers and the effects of the GFC.

In June 2010 a new committee was formed and the Tiger Snakes were officially retired, with the club re-launching as the Geelong Raiders.

In December 2010 the club appointed John O'Bryan as President along with Nick McDonald as Vice President and Kalli Ratcliff as the Secretary.

One of the first actions as a new club saw the appointment of Matt Goschnick as the Senior Coach with Doug Harrington appointed to the Coaching Panel.

See also

 Rugby league in Victoria

References

External links
 Geelong Raiders Rugby League Football Club Homepage

Rugby league clubs in Melbourne
Sport in Geelong
Rugby clubs established in 2004
Rugby league teams in Victoria (Australia)
2004 establishments in Australia